Hilfield Castle, also Hilfield Lodge, is a country estate and house about  east of Watford and  southwest of Aldenham,  in Hertfordshire, on the outskirts of London in the United Kingdom. The estate contains two large reservoirs, one of which were built by French prisoners of war in the 1790s,. The grounds  now form Aldenham Country Park.  Elstree Aerodrome is located just to the east and the M1 motorway passes to the west.

History and description
The castle dates to 1798–99, when it was built by architect Jeffry Wyatt for Hon. George Villiers, brother of the earl of Clarendon. to replace Slys Castle. It is a picturesque Gothic design, and the estate includes numerous cottages, barns and a boathouse on the reservoir.

Nikolaus Pevsner notes that it is a "castellated, turreted, and cemented house with a gatehouse complete with portcullis". He also notes that the entrance and south sides are symmetrical and that the conservatory is of "ecclesiastical appearance." The castle is built from brick with a 4-storey central tower "flanked by octagonal turrets to lower 4-storey bays with outer 2-storey bays with a later mansard attic." The turrets have slit windows, which are machicolated and crenellated. Of note is the "octagonal Breakfast Room with a vaulted ceiling and a Gothic conservatory." It became a Grade II* listed building on 1 June 1984. It is owned by the Jefferis family as a private house and is not open to the public.

It was sold in 1818 by Villiers to John Fam Timins. He had served in the British East India Company, for whom he had captained several East Indiamen; he had most notably participated in the Battle of Pulo Aura. When he died in 1843, his son William Raikes Timins succeeded him. He died in 1866,  and was succeeded by his nephew the Rev. Douglas Cartwright Timins, who died in 1872, when Hilfield passed to his son Douglas Theodore, who sold the house and park in 1906 to the late Lord Aldenham.

Reservoirs 
The reservoir nearest to the house is called Hilfield reservoir and is owned by Affinity Water. It is managed as a wildlife reserve by the Herts and Middlesex Wildlife Trust and is not open to the public except by appointment.   It was built in 1953.

The more southerly reservoir is called Aldenham reservoir and forms part of Aldenham Country Park. It is open to the public with trails and other attractions  and  hosts a sailing club. It was built by French prisoners of war during the Napoleonic war.

Film location
The castle has appeared in several TV series and films, including Stanley Kubrick's motion picture Lolita (1962) when it served as Peter Sellers's “Pavor Manor”, George Pollock's film Murder at the Gallop (1963), and an episode of Randall and Hopkirk (Deceased) ("For the Girl Who Has Everything", 1969) when it was occupied by Lois Maxwell.

External links
Aerial photographs from 1949. Britain from Above, Accessed Feb 2018

References

Country houses in Hertfordshire
Castles in Hertfordshire
Houses completed in 1799
Grade II* listed houses
Grade II* listed buildings in Hertfordshire
Gothic architecture in England